The Mountain Avenue Historic District is a stretch of historic houses on Mountain Avenue in Princeton, New Jersey that date to the 19th and early 20th centuries.

See also
National Register of Historic Places listings in Mercer County, New Jersey

References

Historic districts in Princeton, New Jersey
National Register of Historic Places in Mercer County, New Jersey
Historic districts on the National Register of Historic Places in New Jersey
New Jersey Register of Historic Places